Valazjerd or Velazjerd or Walazird may refer to:

Valazjerd, Markazi
Valazjerd, Farahan, Markazi Province
Valazjerd, Qazvin

See also
Velashjerd (disambiguation)